is a Shingon temple in Matsuyama, Ehime Prefecture, Japan. It is Temple 52 on the Shikoku 88 temple pilgrimage, and Temple 3 on the Thirteen Buddhist Sites of Iyo. The Hondō is a National Treasure.

History
Taisan-ji is said to have been founded by a wealthy merchant from Kyushu in the sixth century, after he had been saved from a shipwreck by Jūichimen Kannon. The temple enjoyed imperial patronage from the time of Emperor Shōmu.

Buildings
 Hondō (Kamakura period), (National Treasure)
 Niōmon (Kamakura period) (Important Cultural Property)

Treasures
  (Heian period) (Important Cultural Property)
  (Heian period) (Important Cultural Property)

See also
 Shikoku 88 temple pilgrimage
 List of National Treasures of Japan (temples)
 Thirteen Buddhist Sites of Iyo

References

Buddhist temples in Ehime Prefecture
Shingon Buddhism
Buddhist pilgrimage sites in Japan
National Treasures of Japan